Reshe is the most divergent of the Kainji languages of Nigeria. It is spoken on the northern and southern sides of Kainji Lake. It is spoken in Yauri LGA, Kebbi State, and in Borgu LGA, Niger State.

Birnin Yauri (Ireshe ubinə) is the ancient city of the Reshe people, and is situated about five miles east of Yelwa.

References

Further reading
Sociolinguistic survey (level one) of the Reshe people

External links
Reshe dictionary

Kainji languages
Languages of Nigeria